Mervyn William Lee (18 August 1920 – 13 December 2009) was an Australian politician who served as the Liberal member for Lalor from 1966 to 1969. He died in December 2009 at the age of 89.

Early life and war service
Born in Broadford, Victoria in August 1920, he was educated at Kingswood College in Melbourne before becoming a Commonwealth public servant. After serving in the Royal Australian Navy in World War II 1941–46, he became a drapery and hardware merchant. He played Australian rules football for Acton in the Canberra Australian National Football League and while captain of Acton in 1947 won the Mulrooney Medal.

Political career
In 1966, he was elected to the Australian House of Representatives as the Liberal member for Lalor, defeating long-serving Labor member Reg Pollard. He held the seat until 1969, when a redistribution erased his majority and gave Labor a notional six-percent majority.  Believing this made Lalor impossible to hold, Lee unsuccessfully contested the nearby seat of Bendigo.

References

1920 births
2009 deaths
20th-century Australian politicians
Acton Football Club players
Australian rules footballers from Victoria (Australia)
Hardware merchants
Liberal Party of Australia members of the Parliament of Australia
Members of the Australian House of Representatives
Members of the Australian House of Representatives for Lalor
Public servants from Melbourne
Royal Australian Navy personnel of World War II